Young & Reckless is an album by Dirty Penny.

Young & Reckless or Young and Reckless may also refer to:

Music

Albums
 Young & Reckless, EP by Jon Langston
 Young & Reckless, originally titled Peace and Love, album by Eric Donaldson
 Young & Reckless, album by Blac Youngsta of the Cocaine Muzik Group

Singles
 "Young & Reckless", song by Chief Keef feat. Lil Durk
 "Young & Reckless", song by Joe Jonas, unreleased  
 "Young & Reckless", song by Jaden Smith from the album CTV2
 "Young & Reckless", song by Jon Langston from the EP of the same name
 "Young & Reckless", song by Sak Noel feat. Da Beat Freakz
 "Young & Reckless", song by Discipline from the dual album Working Class Heroes by Agnostic Front and Discipline.
 "Young n' Reckless", song by Krept and Konan from the album Young Kingz

Other uses
 Young & Reckless, a clothing brand founded by Chris Pfaff

The Young and the Reckless
The Young and the Reckless may refer to:
 "The Young and the Reckless", episode of Mad Love
 "The Young and the Reckless", episode of Storage Wars
 "The Young and the Reckless", episode of Cops
 "The Young and the Reckless", episode of Kuu Kuu Harajuku
 "The Young and the Reckless", episode of Most Daring

See also
 Vanguard of the Young & Reckless, album by The Stanfields
 Young and Restless (disambiguation)